Marmaduke Military Academy was a boys' military school that operated in Sweet Springs, Missouri from 1891 to 1896.

In 1891, Charles T. Farrar and Frank R. Tate purchased a closed resort hotel in Sweet Springs and established Marmaduke Military Academy to "develop soldier-like qualities and to make capable men." The salt and sulphur springs in Saline County, Missouri attracted cadets and vacationers to the small town. In fact, the owners leased out the academy in the summers to use as a resort once again. Each night, a St. Louis orchestra would play in the ballroom/gymnasium, and lawn croquet was a favorite game.

In an 1892 article published in OUTING magazine titled "Military Schools of the United States" (pp 330,388,473) Marmaduke is identified as the state chartered military school for Missouri. It did therefore receive funding from the state for its operation.

One of the instructors at Marmaduke was Harris L Moore, son of John Courtney Moore, who had been a second in a duel fought by General Marmaduke.  Harris graduated from the University of Missouri in 1892 and taught at Marmaduke for three years starting in 1893.  He is pictured, 3rd from the right, back row, along with the staff of Marmaduke in the below photo, taken in 1893.  He would go on to have a distinguished legal career and was at the time of his early death, a Circuit Court Judge. The photo was given to my Uncle Richard A Moore, by Frank James, nephew of Jesse James, in Excelsior Springs, Missouri.

In 1896, the barracks/resort burned to the ground. The owners chose not to rebuild, but instead sold their assets to Wentworth Military Academy in Lexington, Missouri.  Among the Marmaduke faculty who moved on to Wentworth was bandmaster E. J. Stark, later to become a noted ragtime composer.

References 

 1, 2, 3

Defunct United States military academies
Educational institutions established in 1891
Buildings and structures in Saline County, Missouri
Educational institutions disestablished in 1896
Defunct schools in Missouri
1891 establishments in Missouri
1896 disestablishments in the United States